Peter James Hasney  (1864–1908) was an English born Major League Baseball outfielder.

External links

Major League Baseball outfielders
Major League Baseball players from the United Kingdom
Major League Baseball players from England
English baseball players
Philadelphia Athletics (AA) players
19th-century baseball players
1864 births
1908 deaths
Augusta Browns players
Lancaster Ironsides players
Williamsport (minor league baseball) players
Scranton Miners players
Wilkes-Barre Coal Barons players
Johnstown (minor league baseball) players
Ashland (minor league baseball) players
Hazleton Pugilists players
Norristown (minor league baseball) players
Lebanon (minor league baseball) players
Wilmington Blue Hens players